Anni Bruk (20 July 1924 – 20 October 1998) was an Austrian athlete. She competed in the women's shot put at the 1948 Summer Olympics.

References

1924 births
1998 deaths
Athletes (track and field) at the 1948 Summer Olympics
Austrian female shot putters
Olympic athletes of Austria
Place of birth missing